Mamukkoya (born 5 July 1946) is an Indian actor known for his work in Malayalam cinema, and has also appeared in French film Flammens of Paradise. He has mostly appeared in comedic roles. His unique usage of the Mappila dialect and style marks his presence in the industry. He has acted in more than 450 Malayalam films and is the first winner of the State award for best Comedian in Malayalam cinema.

Early and personal life
He is born to Chalikandiyil Muhammed and Imbachi Ayisha on 5 July 1946. He has a brother Koyakutty. He had his primary education from MM High School, Calicut.

He is married to Suhara. The couple has four children, Muhammed Nisar, Shahitha, Nadiya and Abdul Rasheed. He is residing in Kozhikode near Beypore.

Career 
Mamukkoya started his career as a theatre actor. He got his chance in the film industry through Anyarude Bhoomi (1979). His second entry to Malayalam cinema was through S. Konnanatt's Surumaitta Kannukal. After this film, he was introduced to Sathyan Anthikkad by scriptwriter and actor Sreenivasan. He landed a role in Gandhinagar Second Street. His portrayal of Gafoor in Sathyan Anthikkad's Mohanlal – Sreenivasan starring Nadodikkattu (1987) carved a niche for him in Malayalam cinema. The character Gafoor now enjoys a cult following in Kerala. An animation series was later released based on this character. His award-winning performance in Perumazhakkalam (2004) proved that he can handle non-comedy roles as well with ease. He again did a similar role in Byari, which won the National Film Award for Best Feature Film. He did the title role in the film Korappan, the great (2001), which depicted him as a forest brigand like Veerappan.
In 2004, he received a Special Mention in the Kerala State Film Award for the movie Perumazhakkalam.

Awards 
Kerala State Film Award
 2004 – Special Mention – Perumazhakkalam
 2008 – Best Comedian – Innathe Chintha Vishayam

Jaihind TV Award
 2008 – Best Comedy Artist – Innathe Chintha Vishayam
 2009 – Kala Ratnam Award of KALA Abu Dhabi

Filmography

Malayalam

Tamil

French

Television
 Manasi (Doordarshan)
 Chiri Arangu (Surya Comedy Channel)
 Cinemala (Asianet) as Gafoor (recreation of Nadodikkattu character in one of the episode)
 Akkare Ikkare (2009) Asianet)
Santhanagopalam (2005) Asianet)
Badai Bungalow (Asianet) as Guest 
Star Magic (2021) (Flowers) as Guest

Short films
 Native Bappa by Mappila Lahala
 Al Moidu by Zakeen TV
 Funeral of Native Son by Bodhi Silent Scape

References

External links 

 Memoirs written by Film Star Mamukkoya with Thaha Madayi
Publisher: DC Books, Kottayam Pages: 102 Paperback
 Jeevitham: Mamukkoya/Kozhikode കല്ലായിക്കൂപ്പില്‍ അളവുകാരന്‍, നാടക നടന്‍, സിനിമാ നടന്‍ ഇങ്ങനെ ജീവിതത്തില്‍ വ്യത്യസ്‌ത റോളുകള്‍ ചെയ്‌ത  മാമുക്കോയയുടെ ജീവിതകഥയുടെ രണ്ടാം ഭാഗം. പഴയ കോഴിക്കോടന്‍ ജീവിതത്തിലെ ചില സംഭവങ്ങളെയും വ്യക്‍തികളെയും ഓര്‍ത്തെടുക്കുകയാണ് മാമുക്കോയ ഇതില്‍.

Indian male film actors
Male actors from Kozhikode
Kerala State Film Award winners
1946 births
Living people
Male actors in Malayalam cinema
Malayalam comedians
Indian male comedians
Indian Muslims
20th-century Indian male actors
21st-century Indian male actors
Male actors in Malayalam television
Indian male television actors